Anton Huber was a sailor from Germany, who represented his country at the 1928 Summer Olympics in Amsterdam, Netherlands.

Sources

External links
 

Sailors at the 1928 Summer Olympics – 6 Metre
Olympic sailors of Germany
German male sailors (sport)
Year of birth missing
Possibly living people